Anna Mąka  (born 22 May 1992 in Zakopane) is a Polish biathlete. She competed at the 2022 Winter Olympics, in Women's sprint, Women's individual, and Women's relay.

References

External links  

1992 births
Living people
Biathletes at the 2022 Winter Olympics
Polish female biathletes
Olympic biathletes of Poland
Sportspeople from Zakopane